Archduchess Elisabeth Franziska Marie Karoline Ignatia Salvator (27 January 1892 – 29 January 1930) was the eldest daughter of Archduke Franz Salvator of Austria and Archduchess Marie Valerie of Austria. Through her mother, she was a granddaughter of Emperor Franz Joseph I of Austria and through her father she was a descendant of King George II of Great Britain.

Biography

She was born in Vienna on 27 January 1892 to Archduke Franz Salvator of Austria and his wife, Archduchess Marie Valerie, youngest daughter of Emperor Franz Joseph I of Austria. She married at Niederwallsee on 19 September 1912 Georg Count von Waldburg zu Zeil und Hohenems (1878–1955). The marriage was one of love and not a political marriage. Georg von Waldburg had no money or property, and had been hired as a tutor for her brothers.

They had four children, three daughters and a son:

 Countess Marie Valerie von Waldburg-Zeil (1913–2011), married Archduke Georg of Austria, Prince of Tuscany (1905–1952) in 1936. He was the younger son of Archduke Peter Ferdinand of Austria and his wife, Princess Maria Cristina of Bourbon-Two Sicilies.
 Countess Klementine von Waldburg-Zeil (1914–1941), unmarried and without issue.
 Countess Elisabeth von Waldburg-Zeil (1917–1979), unmarried and without issue.
 Count Franz Josef von Waldburg-Zeil (1927–2022), married Countess Priscilla of Schönborn-Wiesentheid in 1956. They had seven children.

Archduchess Elisabeth Franziska was a painter for some time. She died, aged 38, of pneumonia on 29 January 1930. Her widower remarried nearly two years later, on 29 December 1931, to her younger sister Gertrud.

Ancestry

References

External links

1892 births
1930 deaths
House of Habsburg-Lorraine
Austrian princesses
Deaths from pneumonia in Austria